Beuzeville/Ste Mère Eglise (Beuzeville) Airfield is an abandoned World War II military airfield, which is located near the commune of Beuzeville-au-Plain in  the Normandy region of northern France.

Located just outside Beuzeville-au-Plain, the United States Army Air Force established a temporary airfield shortly after D-Day on 7 June 1944, shortly after the Allied landings in France  The airfield was one of the first established in the liberated area of Normandy, being constructed by the IX Engineering Command, 819th Engineer Aviation Battalion.

History
Known as Advanced Landing Ground "A-6", the airfield consisted of a single 5000' (1500m) Square-Mesh Track runway aligned 05/23. In addition, tents were used for billeting and also for support facilities. An access road was built to the existing road infrastructure, and a dump for supplies, ammunition, and gasoline drums, along with a drinkable water and minimal electrical grid for communications and station lighting.

Construction of the airfield began on the morning of June 8, when an advanced element stronger than fifty men began work at about 10:00 a.m. After a day of hard work almost in the heart of the fighting during which the battalion lost 7 men, the runway was almost ready. The presence of snipers and enemy aircraft at night prohibited night work. First the land was put to the standard R & R (refueling and rearming). In this configuration, it ended 14 June. Nevertheless, from June 10, 3 spitfires from a Polish squadron of the 2nd Tactical Air Force British had already landed. The first American plane landed there on 11. The same day, 5 Waco gliders filled with ammunition and reinforcements to the 82nd Airborne also were there. The next day an air drop of more than 20 tons of ammunition occurred above the airfield. The rest of the battalion joined the media company on 11 and 12 June.

It was declared operational on 14 June, 8 days after D-Day, and served as the first airfield on the beachhead.  The fighter planes flew support missions during the Allied invasion of Normandy, patrolling roads in front of the beachhead, strafing German military vehicles and dropping bombs on gun emplacements, anti-aircraft artillery and concentrations of German troops in Normandy and Brittany when spotted.

After the Americans moved east into Central France with the advancing Allied Armies, the airfield was left un-garrisoned and used for resupply and casualty evacuation.   It was closed on 18 September 1944 and the land returned to agricultural use.

Major units assigned
 371st Fighter Group 15 June - 18 September 1944
 404th (9Q), 405th (8N), 406th (4w) Fighter Squadrons (P-47D)
 367th Fighter Group 22 July - 14 August 1944
 392d (H5), 393d (8L), 394th (4N) Fighter Squadrons (P-38)

Current use
Today the airfield is a mixture of various agricultural fields. A memorial to the men and units that were stationed at Beuzeville was placed at the site of the former airfield.  It is located near  La Londe, bordering the D17 towards Beuzeville-au-Plain.

See also

 Advanced Landing Ground

References

External links

  A-6 Memorial

World War II airfields in France
Airfields of the United States Army Air Forces in France
Airports established in 1944